Women's rhythmic individual all-around competition at the 2008 Summer Olympics was held at the Beijing University of Technology Gymnasium.

There were two rounds of competition in the individual competition. In each round, competing gymnasts performed four routines. One routine was performed with each of the four apparatus: hoop, clubs, rope, and ribbon. The combined scores from the four routines made up the preliminary round score. The top ten gymnasts after the preliminary round advanced to the finals. There, they performed each routine again. Preliminary scores were ignored, and the top combined final scores won. Eight gymnasts arrived from the past olympic games and six of them were able to repeat an olympic final, Almudena Cid from Spain competed in a record 4th olympic games with their respective finale being thereby the rhythmic gymnast that has reached the most finals.

Qualification

Final

References

External links
 Competition format
 Qualification results
 Final results

Gymnastics at the 2008 Summer Olympics
2008
2008 in women's gymnastics
Women's events at the 2008 Summer Olympics